Hauenštejn (Czech var.: Horní hrad) is a medieval castle in the Czech Republic. The castle is private property of Pavel Palacký, a descendant of František Palacký.

It is  situated in the Ore mountains near the cities Stráž nad Ohří, Ostrov nad Ohří, Klášterec nad Ohří and Karlovy Vary not far from the highest peak of Krušné hory – Klínovec.

History 
The castle was built in the 13th century by Přemysl Otakar II or his son Václav II to guard royal paths and local mines. The first known owner was Mikuláš Winkler, burgrave of Loket Castle, who sold Hauenštejn to the monastery in Doksany. The monastery exchanged it for another building with King John of Luxemburg. His son Charles IV enlarged the castle‘s domain. The castle frequently changed its keepers in the second half of the 14th century and the 15th century but it more or less remained royal property. The rich family of Šlik that started silver mining near Jáchymov won the castle in the 16th century. The Šliks rebuilt the castle in the Renaissance style after a fire in 1600. In 1663 the Šliks sold the castle to the Saxe-Lauenburg ducal family and it became part of the Ostrov domain. The castle was in the hands of the Baden family from 1689. When the last male member of the family died in 1771, the property of the Badens in Bohemia was inherited by the royal family of Maria Theresa. The Habsburgs sold it to the Buquoy family in 1837. Countess Gabrielle Buquoy started to rebuild the castle in a Romantic style. Ferdinand Buquoy continued the reconstruction under the influence of historism, taking its examples from England (Windsor, Arundel, Belvoir, Lancaster or Oxford) and Bavaria (Hohenswangau, Lahneck).

20th century 
In World War II it was used by the Hitler Youth and it was also used for snake experiments – a snake from the genus of Coluber was set in the location to fight the adder and a kind of serum was developed there that Rommel used in Africa. After the war it was confiscated by the state and communists made it an accommodation for the uranium miners in Jáchymov, and then for a youth organisation. In 1958 it was condemned as not suitable for living and closed up. From that time it was constantly being ruined, partly by time, partly by vandals.

Present 
In 2000 Pavel Palacký, a descendant of Czech historian František Palacký, bought the castle from the village of Krásný Les and started with its sanitation. He brings a lot of events and tourists. He lives in the castle with his wife and son.

References

External links 
 Hrad Hauenštejn – Horní hrad na Krusnohorsky.cz
  Homepage of the castle

Karlovy Vary District
Castles in the Karlovy Vary Region
Tourist attractions in the Karlovy Vary Region